Micropterix minimella is a species of moth belonging to the family Micropterigidae. It was described by Heath in 1973. It is known from Mallorca.

The wingspan is 3.8 mm for males and 3.6 mm for females.

It was found near Brachypodium ramosum.

References

Micropterigidae
Moths described in 1973
Endemic fauna of the Balearic Islands
Fauna of Mallorca
Moths of Europe